Brambleside Ward is a 2-member ward within Kettering Borough Council, Northamptonshire, East Midlands, in England.

The ward was last fought at Borough Council level in the Kettering Council election, 2015, in which both seats were won by the Conservatives.

The current councillors are Cllr. Michael Brown  and Cllr. Ash Davies.

Brambleside Ward was created in 1999 following a boundary review. The ward was previously part of 'Kingsley Ward'.

Councillors
Kettering Borough Council Election, 2015
Michael Brown (Conservative)
Ash Davies (Conservative)

Kettering Borough Council Election, 2011
Maurice Bayes (Conservative)
Paul Marks (Conservative)

Kettering Borough Council Election, 2007
Maurice Bayes (Conservative)
Paul Marks (Conservative)

Kettering Borough Council Election, 2003
Bill Parker (Conservative)
Pat Anderson (Conservative)

Kettering Borough Council Election, 1999
Bill Parker (Conservative)
Carolyn Maxted (Conservative)

Current Ward Boundaries (2007 - present)

Kettering Town Council 2021

Kettering Borough Council Elections 2015

Kettering Borough Council Elections 2011

Kettering Borough Council Elections 2007
Note: due to boundary changes, vote changes listed below are based on notional results.

Previous Ward Boundaries (1999-2007)

Kettering Borough Council Elections 2003

(Vote count shown is ward average)

Kettering Borough Council Elections 1999

(Vote count shown is ward average)

See also
Kettering
Kettering Borough Council

References

Electoral wards in Kettering